The Toneelschrijfprijs is an annual literary award awarded to the playwrights of a Dutch-language play that debuted in the preceding season. The award ceremony is held in either Flanders or the Netherlands.  The prize was first awarded in 1988 as the Nederlands-Vlaamse Toneelschrijfprijs.

The award was renamed in 1993 to Taalunie Toneelschrijfprijs and in 2018 to Toneelschrijfprijs. As of 2018 the prize is a collaboration between the Nederlandse Taalunie (Dutch Language Union), the Fonds Podiumkunsten, the Nederlands Letterenfonds and the Vlaams Fonds voor de Letteren.

Winners

Nederlands-Vlaamse Toneelschrijfprijs 

 1988: Frans Strijards, Hitchcocks driesprong
 1989: Judith Herzberg, Kras
 1990: Arne Sierens, Mouchette
 1990: Alex van Warmerdam, Het Noorderkwartier
 1991: Jan Decorte, Meneer, de zot en het kind
 1992: Suzanne van Lohuizen, Het huis van mijn leven and Heb je mijn kleine jongen gezien

Taalunie Toneelschrijfprijs 

 1993: Tom Jansen, SCHADE/Schade
 1994: Karst Woudstra, De stille grijzen van een winterse dag in Oostende
 1995: Koos Terpstra, De Troje Trilogie
 1996: Rob de Graaf, 2Skin
 1997: Geertui Daem, Het moederskind
 1998: Peer Wittenbols, April (1864 - 1889)
 1999: Paul Pourveur, Stiefmoeders
 2000: Ramsey Nasr, Geen lied
 2001: Luk Perceval and Peter Verhelst, Aars!
 2002: Peter de Graef, Niks
 2003: Jeroen van den Berg, Blowing
 2004: David Van Reybrouck, Die Siel van die Mier
 2005: Anna Enquist, Antoine Uitdehaag and Anne Vegter, Struisvogels op de Coolsingel
 2006: Kris Cuppens, Lied
 2007: Rob de Graaf, Vrede
 2008: Filip Vanluchene, Citytrip
 2009: Stijn Devillé, Hitler is dood
 2010: Lot Vekemans, Gif
 2011: Alex van Warmerdam, Bij het kanaal naar links
 2012: Ad de Bont, Mehmet de Veroveraar
 2013: Bernard Dewulf, Een lolita
 2014: Freek Vielen, Dracula
 2015: Freek Mariën, Wachten en andere heldendaden
 2016: Magne van den Berg, Ik speel geen Medea
 2017: Ilja Leonard Pfeijffer, De advocaat

Toneelschrijfprijs 

 2018: Eric de Vroedt, The Nation
 2019: Nima Mohaghegh and Saman Amini, A Seat at the Table
 2020: Casper Vandeputte and Vincent van der Valk, Immens

References 

Dramatist and playwright awards
Belgian literary awards
Dutch literary awards
Awards established in 1988
1988 establishments in the Netherlands